From List of National Natural Landmarks, these are the National Natural Landmarks in Mississippi.  There are 5 in total.

References

Mississippi
National Natural Landmarks